iRunway is a boutique technology, finance and litigation consulting firm with primary expertise in intellectual property. It specializes in patent litigation, patent valuation, damages, patent portfolio management and technology due diligence advisory to both law firms and corporations.
The company has offices in Austin, Texas; Palo Alto, California; Denver, Colorado and Bangalore, India.

History
iRunway was established in 2006. They claim to provide technology insight in three areas - patent litigation, portfolio analysis and technology research around Intellectual Property.

Its founding team was Ravi Upadrashta, Animesh Kumar, Kunal Sharma and Shashank Kabra – Alumni of the Indian Institute of Technology and Indian School of Business.
iRunway has operations in Austin (TX), Santa Clara (CA), Denver (CO) and Bangalore, India.

Notable Engagements

 Versata vs. SAP - iRunway provided technology support and analysis to Versata’s outside counsel – McKool Smith. In 2009, the jury awarded Versata $138.6 million in damages - the 4th highest patent jury verdict in the US that year.
During the re-trial in 2011, the jury awarded Versata $345 million in damages - $260 million in lost profits and $85 million in reasonable royalties.

References 

 http://www.venturecenter.co.in/nanoworkshop/details/Speaker.pdf

External links 
 

Companies based in Bangalore
Outsourcing companies
Consulting firms established in 2006
Intellectual property law
Indian companies established in 2006
2006 establishments in Karnataka